The Messerschmitt-Bölkow-Blohm Bo 115 was a prototype light, twin-engine, attack helicopter developed by Messerschmitt-Bölkow-Blohm of Ottobrunn, Germany, powered by two Allison 250-C20 turboshafts, and 8 anti-tank missiles. It was based on the mechanical elements of the MBB Bo 105.

See also

References

German military utility aircraft
Bo 105
Attack helicopters
German helicopters
Twin-turbine helicopters